Kučići may refer to the following places in Bosnia and Herzegovina:

 Kučići (Kakanj)
 Kučići (Trebinje)